The Pre-Pastonian Stage or Baventian Stage (from Easton Bavents in Suffolk), is the name for an early Pleistocene stage used in the British Isles. It precedes the Pastonian Stage and follows the Bramertonian Stage. This stage ended 1.806 Ma (million years ago) at the end of Marine Isotope Stage 65. It is not currently known when this stage started. The Pre-Pastonian Stage is equivalent to the Tiglian C4c Stage of Europe and the Pre-Illinoian J glaciation of the early Pre-Illinoian Stage of North America.

Pollen evidence indicates that there were climatic fluctuations from cooler to warmer climates throughout this stage.

References

External links
anonymous, 2007, Global correlation tables for the Quaternary, Subcommission on Quaternary Stratigraphy, Department of Geography, University of Cambridge, Cambridge, England.

Further reading
Bowen, D.Q., 1978, Quaternary geology: a stratigraphic framework for multidisciplinary work.  Pergamon Press, Oxford, United Kingdom. 221 pp. 
Ehlers, J., P. L. Gibbard, and J. Rose, eds., 1991, Glacial deposits in Great Britain and Ireland. Balkema, Rotterdam. 580 pp 
Mangerud, J., J. Ehlers, and P. Gibbard, 2004, Quaternary Glaciations: Extent and Chronology 1: Part I Europe, Elsevier, Amsterdam.  
Sibrava, V., Bowen, D.Q, and Richmond, G.M., 1986, Quaternary Glaciations in the Northern Hemisphere, Quaternary Science Reviews, vol. 5, pp. 1-514.

See also
Ice age
Glacial period
Last glacial period
Timeline of glaciation

Glaciology
Pleistocene

fi:Pre-Pastonian